Ritmo Kombina (Combined rhythm) is a style of popular Dutch Antillean music, influenced by zouk and soca music.  The lyrics of combined rhythm are generally in the local Papiamento language.

Performers 

Gibu i su Orkesta
Expresando Rimto i Ambiente
OK Band
Happy Peanuts

References 

 

Caribbean music genres
Papiamento